Another Time is an album by jazz drummer Jeff Williams, an American expatriate living in England. The album was released on October 10, 2011 by Whirlwind Recordings.

Track listing
 Search Me
 She Can't Be a Spy
 Double Life
 Purple, Blue and Red
 Fez
 Under the Radar
 Go Where You're Watching
 Another Time

Personnel
 Jeff Willams – drums
 Duane Eubanks – trumpet
 John O'Gallagher – alto saxophone
 John Hébert – double bass

References

2011 albums